Charles Graham "Tim" Toppin (17 April 1906 – 20 May 1972) was an English first-class cricketer who played in four matches for Worcestershire in the late 1920s. 

Toppin was educated at Malvern College in Worcestershire. He was blinded in one eye by a blow from a cricket ball when he was 14. 

A hard-hitting batsman, Toppin scored only 17 runs in his four games for Worcestershire, but had a long and successful club cricket career for Blackheath, The Arabs, Old Malvernians and other clubs. He appeared in a single-innings 12-a-side match for Blackheath against the touring Indians in 1932.

A number of his relatives played first-class cricket. His father, also Charles, played for Cambridge University in the 1880s; three uncles (Arthur Day, Sam Day and Sydney Day) played for Kent; his brother John Toppin appeared once for Worcestershire; and his brother-in-law Basil Brooke had two games for the Royal Navy.

References

External links

English cricketers
Worcestershire cricketers
1906 births
1972 deaths
People from Malvern, Worcestershire
People educated at Malvern College